Lystrup is a suburb to Aarhus, Denmark. It is located 10 km north of Aarhus city centre, west of Egå and the Bay of Aarhus. It had a population of 10,273 (1 January 2022), and is the second most populous urban area of Aarhus Municipality. 

Locally, the town is known by its unfavourable nickname "Gun City", which it was labelled during the 1990s, where the town saw a rise in shootings due to housing a biker chapter during Great Nordic Biker War.

Schools 

Two schools (Lystrup Skole , Elsted Skole), several kindergartens, after-school centres and private daycarers makes Lystrup a suburb full of childlife, and the town has seen a substantial inflow of family residents in recent years.

Shopping 

Lystrup also provides good shopping possibilities, with several smaller, specialized boutiques along with one major, and three minor supermarkets. SuperBrugsen is one of the big co-operative supermarket chains in Denmark, Lystrup also have a Netto and an Aldi . Lystrup also provides a local library, for all citizens of Aarhus to loan books, free of charge.

Sports 

Lystrup also has great sport facilities, and the local club Lystrup IF offers a wide range of activities on all levels, including association football, water polo, tennis, handball, swimming, badminton, squash and basketball.

Industry 

A huge industrial area lies on the south-east side of Lystrup, and one of Denmark and Europe's biggest defence companies Terma has its headquarters here.

Public transport 

Public transportation in Lystrup and Aarhus is primarily by buses, but Lystrup also has a small train station for the local train, named Aarhus Letbane. that serves the citizens of eastern Jutland from the city of Grenaa to Aarhus, and to a city south from Aarhus, Odder Municipality. Two Letbane lines connects to Lystrup, L1 and L2.  Also buses 1A, 18 and 32 go to the town several times an hour. All public transportation is provided by Midttrafik.

Recreational areas 

Lystrup has a forest and four parks. Centrally in the town, north of the railroad, lies Southern Forest (Danish: Sønderskov), officially rated as a dog forest where visitors may let their dogs roam freely. Southern forest is used for a wide range of recreational activities such as horseback-riding, jogging and scouting. The four parks are Hovmarken, Indelukket, Æblehaven and Hedeskovparken. Egå Engsø lies south of the city and from it the river New Egå (Danish: Ny Egå) runs to the coast and bay.

Churches 

Just north of the forest you will find one of three churches in the Lystrup area, Lystrup Church is the new church in town, built in 1989. Other churches are Elev Church (built circa 1100), located in the village of Elev just west of Lystrup, and Elsted Church (built 1210)

Notable people 
 Erik Bue Pedersen (born 1952 in Lystrup) a former Danish handball player; competed in the 1980 Summer Olympics

Neighbour town 

 Elsted
 Elev
 Nye
 Hjortshøj
 Egå

Cities and towns in Aarhus Municipality
Towns and settlements in Aarhus Municipality